Linda fraterna is a species of beetle in the family Cerambycidae. It was described by Chevrolat in 1852, originally under the genus Amphionycha. It is known from Taiwan and China. It feeds on Chaenomeles japonica and Prunus japonica.

Varietas
 Linda fraterna var. pratti Pic, 1902
 Linda fraterna var. luteonata Pic, 1907
 Linda fraterna var. subtestacea Pic, 1906
 Linda fraterna var. seminigra (Fairmaire, 1887)

References

fraterna
Beetles described in 1852